Halloween asteroid may refer to:

Halloween asteroid (2015), asteroid 2015 TB145 that passed Earth on 2015-10-31
Halloween asteroid (2028), asteroid (35396) 1997 XF11 that will pass Earth on 2028-10-26
Halloween asteroid  passed 6200 km above Earth's surface on 2019-10-31.

See also
 Halloween (disambiguation)